The 2001–02 Ranji Trophy was the 68th season of the Ranji Trophy. Baroda and Railways played the final again but Railways won their first Ranji title.

This was the last season played under the zonal format.

Zonal stage
Central Zone

  Top three teams advanced to the knockout stage.

East Zone

  Top three teams advanced to the knockout stage.

North Zone

  Top three teams advanced to the knockout stage.

West Zone

  Top three teams advanced to the knockout stage.

South Zone

  Top three teams advanced to the knockout stage.

Knockout stage
The draw for the quarter-finals were made after the final zonal-stage match, with the following fixtures announced. The fixtures in the knockout stage of the tournament are played across five days, instead of four days in the zonal stage.

Final

Scorecards and averages
Cricketarchive

Notes

Footnotes

References

External links

Ranji Trophy
Ranji Trophy seasons
Ranji Trophy